Glenn E. Coolidge (December 2, 1902 – September 12, 1962) was an American politician and member of the California State Assembly for the 27th District.

Early life
Coolidge was born in Cripple Creek, Colorado in 1902 and his family moved to Lindsay, California in 1909. He married Margaret Welch, and worked in real estate and investment. Coolidge was a Republican from Felton, California.

Career
He was elected to the Assembly on November 4, 1952 and won reelection four times. He was the only candidate for Assembly for the 27th District in each of his elections. Richard J. Dolwig had held the assembly seat before him, and he was succeeded by Leo Ryan.

Coolidge served as chairman of the Assembly's ways and means committee. During his time on the Assembly, Coolidge led the Republican economy bloc's attempts to stop Assemblyman Jesse M. Unruh from pushing through tax increases promoted by the Governor of California. He was active with the Alcoholic Beverage Rehabilitation Commission, whose purpose was to study issues surrounding alcoholism and methods of treatment.

Coolidge was a Delegate to the Republican National Convention from California in 1956 and 1960. In 1956 he was considered by California Governor Goodwin Knight for the position of California State Treasurer after Charles G. Johnson resigned from the position due to health concerns, but A. Ronald Button was chosen for the position.

Coolidge was the Republican candidate for the United States House of Representatives for California's 12th congressional district, and ran against Democrat W.K. Stewart from Carmel. Coolidge died of a heart attack on September 12, 1962 during his campaign for Congress in September 1962, and Republican Burt L. Talcott was elected. At the time of his death he had a bipartisan following in California state politics.

Glenn Coolidge Drive on the University of California, Santa Cruz campus is named for Coolidge.

See also

Politics of California

References

1902 births
1962 deaths
People from Lindsay, California
Republican Party members of the California State Assembly
20th-century American politicians
People from Cripple Creek, Colorado
People from Felton, California